Tay Valley is a township in eastern Ontario, Canada, on the Tay River in the southwest corner of Lanark County, adjacent to the United Counties of Leeds and Grenville and Frontenac County.  The township administrative offices are located in Glen Tay.

Tay Valley township is distinct from the Township of Tay, 300 km to the west.

History
The township was incorporated on January 1, 1998 by amalgamating the former townships of Bathurst, South Sherbrooke and North Burgess, which date back to the early 19th century. It was originally known as the township of Bathurst Burgess Sherbrooke, but adopted the name of Tay Valley on July 30, 2002. The Canadian Pacific Railway's original mainline (CP Havelock Subdivision) passed through Glen Tay heading west to Havelock then on to Toronto before being abandoned to Tweed in 1973 and to Havelock in 1987. A newer mainline was branched off west of Glen Tay southwest towards Belleville which still handles the CP Rail traffic from Smith Falls to Toronto.

Communities
The township comprises the communities of Althorpe, Bathurst Station, Bells Corners, Bolingbroke, Bolingbroke Siding, Brooke, Christie Lake, DeWitts Corners, Elliot, Fallbrook, Feldspar, Glen Tay, Harper, Maberly, Playfairville, Pratt Corners, Scotch Line, Stanleyville and Wemyss.

The permanent population was 5,571 in the 2011 census. However, similar to adjacent townships, there are also numerous seasonal residents, predominantly cottagers from Ottawa or Kingston. The total population including seasonal residents is estimated over 10,000, in 3,843 households.

Demographics 

Mother tongue:
 English as first language: 94.5%
 French as first language: 3%
 English and French as first language: 0%
 Other as first language: 2.5%

Transportation
The main roads in the township are Highway 7 and Lanark County Road 10.  The Rideau Trail passes through the township, including Murphys Point Provincial Park.

See also
List of townships in Ontario

References

External links 

Township municipalities in Ontario
Lower-tier municipalities in Ontario
Municipalities in Lanark County